Richmond is an English surname, and may refer to any one of the following:
Aaron Richmond (1895–1965), American impresario
Anthony B. Richmond (born 1942), English cinematographer
Barry Richmond  (1947–2002), American systems scientist
Bill Richmond (1763–1829), American–born boxer
Bill Richmond (writer) (1921–2016), American film and television comedy writer
Bill Richmond (director) (born 1958), American television producer and director
Bonnie Richmond, fictional character in the American drama Jericho
Branscombe Richmond (born 1955), American character actor
Cedric Levon Richmond (born 1973), American politician
Charles Wallace Richmond (1868–1932), American ornithologist
Claude Richmond (born 1935), Canadian politician
Dannie Richmond (1935–1988), American jazz drummer
Danny Richmond (born 1984), American ice hockey player
David Richmond (disambiguation), name of various individuals
Dave Richmond, British bass player
Dean Richmond (1804–1866), New York railroad magnate
Dennis Richmond (born 1943), American television news anchor
Deon Richmond (born 1978), American actor
Dorothy Kate Richmond (1861–1935), New Zealand artist
Duke of Richmond, English title, held by several individuals over the centuries
E. J. Richmond (1825-1918), American author
Earl of Richmond, English title, held by several individuals over the centuries
Fiona Richmond (born 1945), English glamour model and actress
Fred Richmond (1923–2019), American politician
Fritz Richmond (1939–2005), American musician
George Richmond (1809–1896), English painter
Graeme Richmond (1934–1991), Australian rules footballer
Henry Richmond (bishop) (1936–2017), Bishop of Repton in the Church of England
Henry Richmond (politician) (1829–1890), 19th century New Zealand farmer and politician
Herbert Richmond (1871–1946), British naval officer
Hiram Lawton Richmond (1810–1885), American politician
Howie Richmond (1918–2012), American music publisher and executive
Hugh Richmond (1893–1940), Scottish footballer
James Buchanan Richmond (1842–1910), American politician and lawyer
James Crowe Richmond (1822–1898), New Zealand politician, engineer and artist
Jane Richmond (born 1961), Welsh chess master
Jeff Richmond (born 1960), American composer
John Richmond (disambiguation), name of various individuals
Jonathan Richmond (1774–1853), American politician
Kenneth Richmond (1926–2006), British wrestler
L. Bruce Richmond (1920–2008), American businessman and politician
Leonard Richmond (1889–1965), British artist
Marcus Richmond (born 1956), American politician
Mike Richmond (skater) (born 1960), Australian skater
Mitch Richmond (born 1965), American basketball player
Sarah Richmond (1843–1921), American teacher
Stanley Richmond fictional character in the American drama Jericho
Tim Richmond (1955–1989), American race car driver
Tim Richmond (photographer) (born 1959), English photographer.
Timothy J. Richmond (born 1948), American molecular biologist
Tom Richmond (disambiguation), name of various individuals
Van Rensselaer Richmond (1812–1883), New York engineer and politician
Volney Richmond (1802–1864), New York politician
Warner Richmond (1886–1948), American actor
William Richmond (politician) (1821–1895), New Zealand politician
William Richmond (physician) (1941–2010) Scottish physician
William Blake Richmond (1842–1921), English painter
William Henry Richmond (1821–1922), American coal mine operator

See also
Richman

English-language surnames
Surnames of English origin
English toponymic surnames